The Queen's Indian Defense (QID) is a chess opening defined by the moves:
1. d4 Nf6
2. c4 e6
3. Nf3 b6

By playing 3.Nf3, White sidesteps the Nimzo-Indian Defense that arises after 3.Nc3 Bb4. The Queen's Indian is regarded as the sister opening of the Nimzo-Indian, since both openings aim to impede White's efforts to gain full control of the center by playing e2–e4. Together, they are a well-respected response to 1.d4.

Main line: 4.g3 
4. g3 (ECO E15–E19) has long been White's most popular line against the Queen's Indian. The standard response for Black through the 1970s was 4...Bb7, but 4...Ba6 has since become the topical line. A rarer third option is 4...Bb4+, which aims to exchange the less useful dark-squared bishop, though this line tends to leave Black with a slightly passive position.

Modern main line: 4...Ba6 
White can defend the pawn at c4 with a piece by playing 5.Nbd2, 5.Qa4, 5.Qc2 or 5.Qb3, but these moves all diminish control of d4, making ...c7–c5 an effective reply for Black; therefore 5. b3 is White's most common response. However, it weakens the dark squares slightly, which Black can take advantage of by playing 5... Bb4+. Now 6.Nbd2 loses material after 6...Bc3 7.Rb1 Bb7 threatening 8...Be4, an opening trap which has ensnared players such as Kamran Shirazi. White's best move is therefore 6. Bd2. However, after 6... Be7 7. Bg2 c6 Black is ready to play ...d7–d5, again attacking the c-pawn. Thus White usually plays 8. Bc3 to clear the d2-square, and after 8... d5 White can play in two ways. After 9. Nbd2 Nbd7 10. 0-0 0-0 11. Re1 c5 Black has achieved his thematic  before White and the resulting position after 12. e4 dxe4 13. Nxe4 is equal. Therefore, the main line continues  9. Ne5 and since Black does not want White to maintain this knight on a strong central outpost, play continues 9... Nfd7 10. Nxd7 Nxd7 11. Nd2 0-0 12. 0-0 Rc8 13. e4. By diverting the black knight on move 9 it is now White who has achieved his central pawn break first. The effect of Black's check 5...Bb4+ has been to lure White's bishop to c3 where it blocks the c-file. This, the current main line of the Queen's Indian, is considered equal by theory and became a frequent guest in grandmaster praxis in the 1980s.

After 5. b3, Black also has several playable alternatives to 5...Bb4+, the most common of which is 5... Bb7 6. Bg2 Bb4+ 7. Bd2 a5. Other possibilities for Black include 5...d5 and 5...b5.

More recently, several grandmasters, including Alexander Beliavsky, Ni Hua, Veselin Topalov, and Magnus Carlsen, have played 5. Qc2. The idea is to allow Black's counterthrust ...c5, the main line running 5... Bb7 6. Bg2 c5. The fashion is for White to sacrifice a pawn with 7. d5, gaining active play. This idea has scored well for White, and new ideas have been cropping up since 2008. The 5.Qc2 lines had previously scored poorly for White according to Emms.

Old main line: 4...Bb7 
The classical main line of the Queen's Indian, the most frequently played line from the 1950s until 4...Ba6 became popular in the 1980s, usually continues: 5. Bg2 Be7 6. 0-0 0-0 7. Nc3 Ne4 8. Qc2 Nxc3 9. Qxc3. Be4. These lines are well known for their drawish tendencies and 4... Bb7 is nowadays often employed by Black as a drawing weapon. White has tried various deviations from the main line in an attempt to unbalance the play. These include:
8. Bd2, which defends the knight on c3 and threatens a d4–d5 push.
7. d5, introduced by Arturo Pomar, and rejuvenated by Lev Polugaevsky's continuation 7... exd5 8. Nh4 threatening to regain the pawn on d5 or to play Nf5.
6. Nc3, which postpones castling in favor of preparing action in the center with the d4–d5 and e2–e4 thrusts.

Other lines

4.a3
The Petrosian Variation, prepares 5.Nc3 by stopping ...Bb4 pinning the knight. White intends to follow up with Nc3 and e4, building a large pawn center. Black usually responds by contesting the e4-square with ...Bb7 and ...d5. (See Gurevich, 1992, for an extensive analysis.) This variation was often used by Garry Kasparov early in his career.

4.Nc3
Black can choose between 4...Bb7 and 4...Bb4.
4... Bb7
5. a3 became the more common move order to reach the Petrosian system by the mid-1980s, where White has avoided 4.a3 c5 5.d5 Ba6 and 4.a3 Ba6.
5. Bg5 is an older line which gives Black good equalizing chances after 5...h6 6.Bh4 g5 7.Bg3 Nh5 8.e3 Nxg3 9.hxg3 Bg7. After 5...Be7, White can play 6.e3 or 6.Qc2.
4... Bb4 (or the  3.Nc3 Bb4 4.Nf3 b6) is a Queen's Indian/Nimzo-Indian line. Moves for White include 5.Bg5, 5.e3, and 5.Qb3. 
After 5. Bg5, Black may play 5...Bb7 or 5...h6.
5...Bb7 6.e3 h6, White can play 7.Bh4.
5...h6 6.Bh4 Bb7 (or by transposition 4...Bb7 5.Bg5 h6 6.Bh4 Bb4), White can play 7.e3. The position after 6...g5 7.Bg3 Ne4 8.Qc2 was heavily played and analyzed in the 1980s. 
After 5. e3, Black usually plays 5...Bb7. White usually plays 6.Bd3 for the Fischer Variation of the Nimzo-Indian (or by transposition 3.Nc3 Bb4 4.e3 b6 5.Bd3 Bb7 6.Nf3). White can play 6.e3, then Black usually plays 6...h6, although 6.Nd2 or 6.Qc2 may be better. 
After 5. Qb3, Black usually plays 5...c5.

4.e3
This apparently quiet development may lead to complex middlegame play. Black usually replies 4...Bb7, then play may continue 5.Bd3 d5 6.0-0 or 5.Nc3 Bb4, transposing into the Nimzo-Indian Defence.

4.Bf4
The Miles Variation, which simply develops the bishop to a good square. Despite some success by its originator, this idea has never been popular.

ECO codes
The Encyclopaedia of Chess Openings classifies the Queen's Indian under codes E12 to E19 according to the following scheme:
E12 – 1.d4 Nf6 2.c4 e6 3.Nf3 b6
E13 – 1.d4 Nf6 2.c4 e6 3.Nf3 b6 4.Nc3 Bb7 5.Bg5
E14 – 1.d4 Nf6 2.c4 e6 3.Nf3 b6 4.e3
E15 – 1.d4 Nf6 2.c4 e6 3.Nf3 b6 4.g3
E16 – 1.d4 Nf6 2.c4 e6 3.Nf3 b6 4.g3 Bb7
E17 – 1.d4 Nf6 2.c4 e6 3.Nf3 b6 4.g3 Bb7 5.Bg2 Be7
E18 – 1.d4 Nf6 2.c4 e6 3.Nf3 b6 4.g3 Bb7 5.Bg2 Be7 6.0-0 0-0 7.Nc3
E19 – 1.d4 Nf6 2.c4 e6 3.Nf3 b6 4.g3 Bb7 5.Bg2 Be7 6.0-0 0-0 7.Nc3 Ne4 8.Qc2

References

Further reading

Chess openings